Tototlán is a town and municipality in Jalisco in central-western Mexico. The municipality covers an area of 292.85 km². Some notable people from Tototlán, Jalisco are Omar Esparza (plays for C.D Guadalajara), Javier Hernández Gutiérrez (retired soccer player, father of Javier Hernández Balcazar "El Chicharito"). Tototlán has a saint called ST. Sabas Reyes, he was tied to a pillar and murdered, that pillar is now part of a big church they built. A temple called "EL CERRITO DE LA CRUZ" was built on a hill, people go there to pray. Besides the church, there is a place called "LA PLAZA" where you can go to socialize with friends and meet new ones. The music they hear is Banda and Mariachi.

, the municipality had a total population of 19,710.

References

Municipalities of Jalisco

A temple called EL CERRITO DE LA CRUZ was built on a hill where a big Jesus was put.  People go there for prayer and mass.  Besides the temple, there is Centro Tototlan which has a plaza, surrounded by local food businesses and live music on Thursdays and Sundays. The music they play is Banda and Corridos. Tototlan also celebrates Las Fiestas de Mayo, which is 9 days of celebration. Games, live music, and events occur for 9 days in la plaza. 

As of 2005, the municipality had a total population of 19,710.[1]